Ross Tannock (born April 30, 1971 in Kilmarnock) is a Scottish retired footballer who currently lives in Florida.

In the spring of 1994, Tannock quickly left Kilmarnock and Scotland and signed with the Fort Lauderdale Strikers of the American Professional Soccer League. The team released him in June 1994. In 1997, Tannock signed with the Orlando Sundogs of the USISL. In 2000, he played for the Palm Beach Pumas. As late as 2002, he was still kicking in the Palm Beach amateur leagues.

References

External links

1971 births
Living people
Ayr United F.C. players
Albion Rovers F.C. players
American Professional Soccer League players
Fort Lauderdale Strikers (1988–1994) players
Orlando Sundogs players
Palm Beach Pumas players
Scottish footballers
Scottish expatriate footballers
Expatriate footballers in Belgium
Expatriate soccer players in the United States
USISL players
USL League Two players
Association football midfielders
Scottish expatriate sportspeople in the United States